"Our Worlds at War" was a comic book storyline, published by DC Comics in mid-2001. OWAW was a crossover storyline that spanned several different books, including several books starring Batman, Superman and Wonder Woman, The Flash, Green Lantern, and a number of supporting characters and books. Creators involved in the crossover included writers Jeph Loeb, Joe Casey, Mark Schultz, Joe Kelly, Phil Jimenez, and Peter David, and artists that included Mike Wieringo, Ed McGuinness, Doug Mahnke, Ron Garney, and Leonard Kirk.

Plot
The crossover, which occurred mainly through the monthly Superman titles, Wonder Woman, and a series of character themed one-shot specials, dealt with the heroes of the DC Universe facing the threat of the cosmic force known as Imperiex, who attacked Earth for the purpose of using the planet as the staging ground for the "hollowing" of the entire universe.

Thanks to the sacrifice of Strange Visitor and General Rock, Earth's forces managed to crack Imperiex's armor, intending that Darkseid would subsequently use boom tube technology to transfer Imperiex's energy back to the galaxies that he had destroyed. However, Brainiac-13 appeared on the battleground with Warworld, and absorbed the Imperiex energies, vowing to use them to rule everything.

In a desperate gambit, Superman dived into the heart of the sun, thus gaining a massive power boost that enhanced his abilities significantly. Rapidly realizing that Warworld could not be destroyed without releasing Imperiex and triggering another Big Bang, Superman and the Martian Manhunter formed a brief telepathic link with the remaining major combatants — including Darkseid, Lex Luthor, Steel and Wonder Woman — to explain their new plan. With Darkseid's powers weakened, they would have to use Tempest, empowered by the faith and strength of the Amazons, focusing the energy through Steel's new 'Entropy Aegis' armor (which was created from a burned-out Imperiex probe), and, with Lex Luthor activating a temporal displacement weapon, Superman would subsequently push Warworld through a temporal boom tube, sending both Imperiex Prime's and Brainiac's consciousness back 14 billion years to the Big Bang, destroying both villains through a combined effort. In his final moments, Imperiex Prime realized, in an ironic twist, that the imperfection he had detected in the universe was himself.

The planet Daxam was involved, temporarily stolen from its rightful orbit.

Characters

 The Flash
 Superman
 Krypto
 Wonder Woman (Diana Prince, Hippolyta)
 Green Lantern (Kyle Rayner)
 The Martian Manhunter
 Aquaman
 The Justice League of America
 Young Justice
 Superboy
 Supergirl
 Imperiex
 Brainiac 13
 Darkseid
 Grayven
 Doomsday
 Lex Luthor
 Suicide Squad
 Manchester Black
 Strange Visitor
 Lois Lane
 Lena Luthor
 Sam Lane

Deaths

Steel: killed, then returned with another suit.
Guy Gardner: suggested by dialogue, later proved false. 
Hippolyta: perished while saving Greek citizens. Has since returned.
Aquaman: presumed dead, Atlantis missing. Has since returned.
Sam Lane: killed. Later turns up alive.
Maxima: killed.
Massacre: killed.
Ma and Pa Kent: missing. Later turn up alive.
Strange Visitor: killed.

Publications 
The story ran through the following issues:
 Action Comics #780-782
 Adventures of Superman #593-596
 Batman #593-594
 Batman: Our Worlds at War #1
 Flash: Our Worlds at War #1
 Green Lantern: Our Worlds at War #1
 Harley Quinn: Our Worlds at War #1
 Impulse #77
 JLA: Our Worlds at War #1
 JSA: Our Worlds at War #1
 Nightwing: Our Worlds at War #1
 Superboy #89-91
 Supergirl #59-61
 Superman #171-173
 Superman: Our Worlds at War Secret Files and Origins #1
 Superman: The Man of Steel #115-117
 Wonder Woman #171-173
 Wonder Woman: Our Worlds at War #1
 World's Finest Comics: Our Worlds at War #1
 Young Justice #35-36
 Young Justice: Our Worlds at War #1
 Superman/Batman #64, #68-71 (a brief new direction of the Superman/Batman series at the start of 2010 that featured a story that took place in the aftermath of Our Worlds at War with #64 acting as a prologue and #68 through #71 being the story proper complete with the trade dress banner).

Collected editions
The story has been collected into trade paperbacks:
 SUPERMAN: OUR WORLDS AT WAR VOL. 1 | 256pg. | Color | Softcover | 
 SUPERMAN: OUR WORLDS AT WAR VOL. 2 | 247pg. | Color | Softcover | 
 SUPERMAN: OUR WORLDS AT WAR THE COMPLETE EDITION | 512pg. | Color | Softcover |

References

Alien invasions in comics